James Aurelio Rendón Villegas (born April 7, 1985 in Fresno, Tolima) is a male race walker from Colombia. He represented his country in the 20 km walk at the 2008 Beijing Olympics and at the 2012 London Olympics.

He was the runner-up in the 20 km race at the 2012 South American Race Walking Championships, finishing behind Caio Bonfim.

Personal bests

International competitions

References

External links

1985 births
Living people
People from Fresno, Tolima
Colombian male racewalkers
Athletes (track and field) at the 2008 Summer Olympics
Athletes (track and field) at the 2012 Summer Olympics
Athletes (track and field) at the 2016 Summer Olympics
Athletes (track and field) at the 2011 Pan American Games
Olympic athletes of Colombia
World Athletics Championships athletes for Colombia
Pan American Games medalists in athletics (track and field)
Pan American Games silver medalists for Colombia
Athletes (track and field) at the 2018 South American Games
South American Games gold medalists for Colombia
South American Games medalists in athletics
Medalists at the 2011 Pan American Games
20th-century Colombian people
21st-century Colombian people